David Ikechukwu Ozoh (born 6 May 2005) is a professional footballer who plays as a midfielder for Crystal Palace. Born in Spain, he has been called up to represent England internationally.

Career
Ozoh joined the youth academy of Crystal Palace at the age of 8. He worked his way up their youth categories, playing for the U18 and U23 sides. On 11 August 2022, he signed his first professional contract with the club. He made his professional debut for Crystal Palace as a late substitute in a 0–0 Premier League draw with Newcastle United on 21 January 2023.

International career
Ozoh was born in Valencia, Spain to Nigerian parents and moved to England at a young age.
 He was called up to the England U18s in March 2023.

Career statistics

References

External links
 

2005 births
Living people
Footballers from Valencia (city)
English footballers
Spanish footballers
English sportspeople of Nigerian descent
Spanish people of Nigerian descent
Immigrants to England
Naturalised citizens of the United Kingdom
Association football midfielders
Crystal Palace F.C. players
Premier League players